Termination: 1456 is an adventure published by FASA in 1984 for the science fiction role-playing game Star Trek: The Role Playing Game, based on Star Trek: The Next Generation.

Plot summary
Termination: 1456 is an adventure for Klingon player characters. The characters are ordered to assassinate a Thought Admiral suspected of treachery against the Emperor. Once the gamemaster has given the players this order, there is no more prepared plotline; the players must decide how to proceed.

Publication history
Termination: 1456 is a 48-page book with a cardstock card that was written by Dale L. Kemper, with illustrations by Norman Miller and cover art by Mitch O'Connell. It was published by FASA in 1985.

Reception
In the February 1986 edition of White Dwarf (Issue #74), John Grandidge called this adventure "very different from the approach of other Star Trek adventures [...] This is quite the most free-form adventure I have seen presented commercially and at first sight is a daunting prospect to run." Grandidge found "the basic plot is believable and interesting." He concluded by giving the book a perfect overall rating of 10 out of 10, saying, "For the remarkably high overall marks below I have chosen to ignore the ridiculous prices of these adventures in order to emphasise the quality of the plots [...] and the encouragement to backstab and bicker in Termination are perfectly faithful to the essence of Star Trek."

References

Role-playing game supplements introduced in 1984
Star Trek: The Role Playing Game adventures